= Mirza Ali-Qoli Kho'i =

Mirza Ali-Qoli Kho'i (Persian: میرزا علیقلی خویی; c. 1815–c. 1856) was a lithographer in Qajar Iran, regarded as the leading figure in his field.

== Sources ==
- Marzolph, Ulrich (2015). "Ḵoʾi, Mirzā ʿAliqoli". In Yarshater, Ehsan (ed.). Encyclopædia Iranica (Online ed.). Encyclopædia Iranica Foundation. ISBN 978-9004471320.
- Marzolph, Ulrich; Zenhari, Roxana (2022). Mirzā ʿAli-Qoli Khoʾi: The Master Illustrator of Persian Lithographed Books in the Qajar Period. Vol. 1. Brill Publishers. ISBN 978-1845118280.
